Nikolay Alexandrovich Vinnichenko (in , born April 10, 1965 in Kazakhstan, Soviet Union) is a Russian lawyer and politician.

Biography 

Nikolay Vinnichenko graduated from the Saint Petersburg State University Faculty of Law with a degree in legal science in 1987.

He started his career as a trainee for the Prosecutor of Saint Petersburg, and became his assistant in 1990. In 1995, he became public prosecutor of Saint Petersburg, and Deputy public prosecutor of the city in 1999. In 2001, he was named Federal inspector in-chief of Saint Petersburg. From April 9, 2003 until September 12, 2004, he was the Chief Prosecutor of Saint Petersburg. From October 21, 2004 he had been the Chief Bailiff, Director of the Federal Bailiffs Service of Russia.

On December 8, 2008, Vinnichenko was appointed to be the Russian Presidential Envoy to the Urals Federal District. Since September 6, 2011, he is the Russian Presidential Envoy to the Northwestern Federal District.

Since 2013, Nikolay Vinnichenko is Deputy Prosecutor General of the Russian Federation.

In the aftermath of the Malaysia Airlines Flight 17 crash, Nikolay Vinnichenko declared, as Deputy Prosecutor General, that Russia had sent to the Dutch-led Joint Investigation Team (JIT) the proof that the missile that caused the crash was a Ukrainian one, and that this information had not been taken into consideration by the JIT.

Nikolay Vinnichenko sanctioned the extradition of the belarusian refugee Andrey Kazimirov, who was seeking asylum in Russia after being tortured by the police 
for 2 days in the aftermath of the Belarus election protests.

Other roles 

 Member of the State Border Commission

Honours and awards
Order of Honour
Medal "In Commemoration of the 300th Anniversary of Saint Petersburg"
Medal "In Commemoration of the 1000th Anniversary of Kazan"

References

Lawyers from Saint Petersburg
1965 births
Medvedev Administration personnel
Living people
1st class Active State Councillors of the Russian Federation